Radevce may refer to:

 Radevce (Aleksinac), a village in Serbia
 Radevce (Lebane), a village in Serbia